The  was a Japanese domain of the Edo period, located in Suō Province (the south of present-day Yamaguchi Prefecture).

List of lords

Kikkawa family (Tozama, 60,000 koku)

Hiroie
Hiromasa
Hiroyoshi
Hironori
Hiromichi
Tsunenaga
Tsunetomo
Tsunetada
Tsunekata
Tsunehiro
Tsuneakira
Tsunemoto
Tsunetake

References
 Iwakuni on "Edo 300 HTML" (10 Oct. 2007)

Domains of Japan